Elaphe hodgsoni, the Hodgson's rat snake, is a species of snake in the family Colubridae. The species is found in parts of Asia around the Himalayas.

Etymology
The specific name, hodgsoni, is in honor of British naturalist Brian Houghton Hodgson.

Description
It is brownish-olive above, with most of the scales black-edged. The young have blackish cross bands. Its lower parts are yellowish, with the outer part of the margin of each ventral shield blackish.

Its rostral is as deep as it is broad, and visible from above. The suture between the internasals is much shorter than that between the prefrontals. Its frontal is as long as its distance from the end of the snout or a little shorter, and shorter than the parietals. The loreal is longer than deep, and often united with the prefrontal. It has one large preocular (a small subocular below the preocular is rarely present) and two postoculars. Temporals are 2+2 or 2+3. Normally there are 8 upper labials, the fourth and fifth entering the eye, and 5 lower labials in contact with the anterior chin shields. The anterior chin shields are as long as the posterior chin shields or a little longer. The dorsal scales are in 23 rows, feebly keeled on the posterior part of the body. Ventrals 233–246; anal divided; subcaudals 79–90.

Geographic range
It is found in Nepal, India (Sikkim, Assam, Kashmir),
and China (Tibet).

Type locality: "China: Ladakh" (Günther 1860) = "Tibet: Ladakh, Tsomoriri" (Boulenger 1894).

Notes

References
Boulenger GA (1894). Catalogue of the Snakes in the British Museum (Natural History). Volume II., Containing the Conclusion of the Colubridæ Aglyphæ. London: Trustees of the British Museum (Natural History). (Taylor and Francis, printers). xi + 382 pp. + Plates I-XX. (Coluber hodgsonii, pp. 35–36).
Das I (2002). A Photographic Guide to Snakes and other Reptiles of India. Sanibel Island, Florida: Ralph Curtis Books. 144 pp. . (Elaphe hodgsoni, p. 33).
Günther A (1860). "Contributions to a knowledge of the reptiles of the Himalaya mountains. - I. Descriptions of the new species. II. List of Himalayan reptiles, with remarks on their horizontal distribution". Proc. Zool. Soc. London 1860: 148–175. (Spilotes hodgsonii, new species, p. 156).
Günther A (1864). The Reptiles of British India. London: The Ray Society. (Taylor and Francis, printers). xxvii + 252 pp. + Plates I-XXVI. (Compsosoma hodgsonii, p. 246).
Smith MA (1943). The Fauna of British India, Ceylon and Burma, Including the Whole of the Indo-Chinese Sub-region. Reptilia and Amphibia. Vol. III.—Serpentes. London: Secretary of State for India. (Taylor and Francis, printers). xii + 583 pp. (Elaphe hodgsoni, p. 152).
Wallach V (1997). "A monograph of the colubrid snakes of the genus Elaphe Fitzinger (book review)". Herpetological Review 28 (2): 110. (Gonyosoma hodgsoni ).

External links
.

Elaphe
Reptiles described in 1860
Taxa named by Albert Günther
Reptiles of India
Reptiles of China
Reptiles of Nepal